Ram Mandir is an under-construction temple at Ram Janmabhoomi in Ayodhya, India.

Ram Mandir ("temple of Rama") may also refer to:

 Ram Mandir, Bhubaneswar, a temple in Bhubaneswar, India
 Ram Mandir railway station in Mumbai, India; named after a local temple